Geoffrey Roy Rush  (born 6 July 1951) is an Australian actor. He is known for his eccentric leading man roles on stage and screen. He is among 24 people who have won the Triple Crown of Acting, having received an Academy Award, a Primetime Emmy Award and a Tony Award. He also received three British Academy Film Awards, two Golden Globe Awards, and four Screen Actors Guild Awards. Rush is the founding president of the Australian Academy of Cinema and Television Arts and was named the 2012 Australian of the Year.

Rush started his professional acting career with the Queensland Theatre Company in 1971. He studied for two years at the L'École Internationale de Théâtre Jacques Lecoq starting in 1975. Rush starred in international productions of Waiting for Godot, The Winter's Tale and The Importance of Being Earnest. He made his Broadway debut in the absurdist comedy Exit the King in 2009, where he received a Tony Award for Best Actor in a Play for his performance. He received a nomination for Drama Desk Award for Outstanding Actor in a Play for Diary of a Madman in 2011.

He gained prominence for his role in Shine (1996), for which he won an Academy Award for Best Actor; his other Oscar-nominated roles were for Shakespeare in Love (1998), Quills (2000), and The King's Speech (2010). Other notable roles include in Elizabeth (1998), Les Misérables (1998), Frida (2001). He gained mainstream popularity for his role as Captain Hector Barbossa in the Pirates of the Caribbean franchise (2003–2017). During this time he also acted in Intolerable Cruelty (2003), Munich (2005), Elizabeth: The Golden Age (2007) and The Book Thief (2013).

Rush is also known for his performances in television receiving Primetime Emmy Award for Outstanding Lead Actor in a Limited or Anthology Series or Movie nominations for his portrayals of comedian Peter Sellers in the HBO film The Life and Death of Peter Sellers (2004), and scientist Albert Einstein in National Geographic anthology series Genius (2017), winning for the former.

Early life
Rush was born on 6 July 1951 in Toowoomba, Queensland, the son of Merle (Bischof), a department store sales assistant, and Roy Baden Rush, an accountant for the Royal Australian Air Force. His father was of English, Irish, and Scottish ancestry, and his mother was of German descent. He has an older sister. His parents divorced when he was five, and his mother subsequently took him to live with her parents in suburban Brisbane. Before he began his acting career, Rush attended Everton Park State High School, and graduated from the University of Queensland with a bachelor's degree in Arts. While at university, he was talent-spotted by Queensland Theatre Company (QTC) in Brisbane. Rush began his career with QTC in 1971, appearing in 17 productions.

In 1975, Rush went to Paris for two years and studied mime, movement and theatre at L'École Internationale de Théâtre Jacques Lecoq, before returning to resume his stage career with QTC. In 1979, he shared an apartment with actor Mel Gibson for four months while they co-starred in a stage production of Waiting for Godot.

Career

1980s
Rush made his theatre debut in the QTC's production of Wrong Side of the Moon. He worked with the QTC for four years, appearing in roles ranging across classical plays and pantomime, from Juno and the Paycock to Hamlet on Ice. Following these, Rush left for Paris where he studied further.

Rush's acting credits include William Shakespeare's plays The Winter's Tale (with the State Theatre Company of South Australia in 1987 at The Playhouse in Adelaide) and Troilus and Cressida (at the Old Museum Building in 1989). He also appeared in an ongoing production of Oscar Wilde's The Importance of Being Earnest as John Worthing (Ernest) (in which his wife, Jane Menelaus, appeared as Gwendolen).

Rush made his film debut in the Australian film Hoodwink in 1981. His next film was Gillian Armstrong's Starstruck, the following year.

1990s
In the 1990s Rush appeared in small roles on television dramas, including a role as a dentist in a 1993 episode of the British television series Lovejoy. Rush also continued his work in theatre. In 1994, Rush played Horatio in a production of Hamlet alongside Richard Roxburgh, Jacqueline McKenzie and David Wenham in the Company B production at the Belvoir St Theatre in Sydney.

Rush made his film breakthrough with his performance in 1996 with Shine, for which he won the Academy Award for Best Actor. Rush had once learned the piano up until aged fourteen but took up piano lessons again thirty years later for the role in order not to require a hand double. That same year, James L. Brooks flew him to Los Angeles to audition for the part of Simon Bishop in As Good as It Gets and offered him the role, but Rush declined it (it went to Greg Kinnear).

In September 1998, Rush played the title role in the Beaumarchais play The Marriage of Figaro for the QTC. This was the opening production of the Optus Playhouse at the Queensland Performing Arts Centre at South Bank in Brisbane. A pun on Rush's name (and the circumstances) was used in the opening prologue of the play with the comment that the "Optus Playhouse was opening with a Rush".

In 1998, he appeared in three major films: Les Misérables, Elizabeth, and Shakespeare in Love. He received his second Academy Award nomination for Best Supporting Actor for the last film. In Les Miserables Rush played Javert opposite Liam Neeson as Jean Valjean. In Elizabeth, Rush portrayed Sir Francis Walsingham alongside fellow Australian Cate Blanchett as Queen Elizabeth I. He received a British Academy Film Award nomination for his performance. In Shakespeare in Love, he played Philip Henslowe, a role Academy Award, British Academy Film Award, Golden Globe Award, and Screen Actors Guild Award nominations.  
 
In 1999, Rush took the lead role as Steven Price in the horror film House on Haunted Hill, and played the villain in the superhero comedy film Mystery Men.

2000s

In 2000, Rush starred in Philip Kaufman's Quills where he played the Marquis de Sade alongside Kate Winslet, Joaquin Phoenix and Michael Caine. The film was written by Tony Award winning playwright Doug Wright who adapted the film's screenplay from his play. Rush received widespread critical acclaim for his performance with Rolling Stone critic Peter Travers' describing his performance as "volcanic", and "scandalously good". For his performance in the film he received his third Oscar nomination this time for Best Actor.

Rush's career continued at a fast pace, with nine films released from 2001 to 2003. In 2002, Rush played Leon Trotsky to Salma Hayek's Frida Kahlo in Julie Taymor's Frida. In the reaction to the #MeToo Movement, Hayek wrote an opinion piece in The New York Times detailing the harassment Harvey Weinstein perpetrated against her. In the article she wrote about her determination to make the movie and praises Rush for agreeing to act in the film.

Rush appeared in several films released in 2003. He played Superintendent Francis Hare in Ned Kelly with Heath Ledger, Orlando Bloom and Naomi Watts. He voiced Nigel the brown pelican in the Disney/Pixar animated film Finding Nemo. Late in the year, he appeared in the Coen Brothers romantic comedy, Intolerable Cruelty alongside George Clooney and Catherine Zeta-Jones.

Rush starred in the film Pirates of the Caribbean: The Curse of the Black Pearl, released in summer 2003, as Captain Hector Barbossa. The film was a massive financial success earning $654.3 million. Rush would continue to reprise the role in its sequels, Dead Man's Chest (2006), At World's End (2007), On Stranger Tides (2011) and Dead Men Tell No Tales (2017). In addition, Rush reprised his character's voice for the enhancements at the Pirates of the Caribbean attractions at the Disneyland and Magic Kingdom theme parks, which involved an audio-animatronic with Rush's likeness being installed (including one at Tokyo Disneyland).

Rush played actor Peter Sellers in the HBO television film The Life and Death of Peter Sellers. For this performance, he won various awards including the Primetime Emmy Award for Outstanding Lead Actor in a Miniseries or Movie, Golden Globe Award for Best Actor – Miniseries or Television Film, and Screen Actors Guild Award for Outstanding Performance by a Male Actor in a Miniseries or Television Movie.

In 2005, he appeared in Steven Spielberg's Munich as Ephraim, a Mossad agent. The film is an account of Operation Wrath of God, the Israeli government's secret retaliation against the Palestine Liberation Organization after the Munich massacre at the 1972 Summer Olympics. It was a critical and financial success earning five Academy Award nominations including for Best Picture. In 2017, the film was named the 16th "Best Film of the 21st Century So Far" by The New York Times.

In 2006, Rush hosted the Australian Film Institute Awards for the Nine Network. He was the master of ceremonies again at the 2007 AFI Awards.

Rush has appeared on stage for the Brisbane Arts Theatre and in many other theatre venues. He has also worked as a theatre director. In 2007, he starred as King Berenger in a production of Eugène Ionesco's Exit the King at the Malthouse Theatre in Melbourne and Company B in Sydney, directed by Neil Armfield. For this performance, he received a Helpmann Award nomination for best male actor in a play.

In the beginning of 2009, Rush appeared in a series of special edition postage stamps featuring some of Australia's internationally recognised actors. He, Cate Blanchett, Russell Crowe, and Nicole Kidman each appear twice in the series. Rush's image is taken from Shine. He also appeared in the musical film Bran Nue Dae as Father Benedictus alongside Rocky McKenzie, Ernie Dingo, Jessica Mauboy, Missy Higgins, Deborah Mailman, Dan Sultan, and Magda Szubanski.

In 2009, Rush made his Broadway debut in a re-staging of Exit the King under Malthouse Theatre's touring moniker Malthouse Melbourne and Company B Belvoir. This re-staging featured a new American cast including Susan Sarandon. The show opened on 26 March 2009 at the Ethel Barrymore Theatre. Rush won the Outer Critics Circle Award, Theatre World Award, Drama Desk Award, the Distinguished Performance Award from the Drama League Award and the 2009 Tony Award for Best Performance by a Leading Actor in a Play.

2010s
In 2010, Rush returned to the stage, playing Man in Chair in The Drowsy Chaperone on its Australian tour. That same year he also voiced Ezylryb/Lyze of Kiel in Legend of the Guardians and played speech and language therapist Lionel Logue in Tom Hooper's historical drama The King's Speech concerning King George VI, played by Colin Firth, and his speech impediment. The film focuses on their unlikely friendship as they work together after Edward VIII played by Guy Pearce abdicates the throne. The new king relies on Logue to help him make his first wartime radio broadcast upon Britain's declaration of war on Germany in 1939. The film also starred Helena Bonham Carter as Queen Elizabeth, and Jennifer Ehle as Myrtle Logue. The film was a financial success earning $424 million at the box office. Rush's performance was praised by critics and earned him a British Academy Film Award win and nominations for the Academy Awards and Golden Globe Awards for Best Supporting Actor.

Rush returned as Captain Hector Barbossa in Pirates of the Caribbean: On Stranger Tides, starring Johnny Depp, in 2011. Rush is also preparing for a film version of The Drowsy Chaperone, an award-winning stage musical. In addition, he voiced the alien Tomar-Re in the film adaptation of the Green Lantern comic book series.

2011 saw Rush play Sir Basil Hunter in the Fred Schepisi directed adaptation of Australian Nobel laureate Patrick White's novel, The Eye of the Storm.

In 2011, Rush played the lead in a theatrical adaptation of Nikolai Gogol's short story The Diary of a Madman at the Brooklyn Academy of Music. He won for this role the Helpmann Award and was nominated for the Drama Desk Award.

From November 2011, Rush played the role of Lady Bracknell in the Melbourne Theatre Company production of The Importance of Being Earnest. Other actors from the 1988 production include Jane Menelaus, this time as Miss Prism, and Bob Hornery, who had played Canon Chasuble, as the two butlers.

In 2011, Rush made a cameo in a commercial, The Potato Peeler, for the Melbourne International Film Festival (MIFF), playing a Polish farmer. He spoke his lines in Polish for the part. In August 2011, Rush was appointed the foundation president of the newly formed Australian Academy of Cinema and Television Arts. He resigned from the post in December 2017 after Sydney Theatre Company announced they had received an accusation of inappropriate behaviour against him.

In 2013, Rush appeared alongside Jim Sturgess in The Best Offer and also appeared in the film version of the best-selling novel The Book Thief. Dennis Harvey of Variety Magazine praised his performance writing, that "Rush generously provides the movie's primary warmth and humor".

In 2017, Rush starred in Stanley Tucci's film Final Portrait alongside Armie Hammer. The film had its world premiere at the Berlin International Film Festival. The film received positive reviews from critics earning a 73% from Rotten Tomatoes with the consensus reading, "Final Portrait finds writer-director Stanley Tucci patiently telling a quietly absorbing story, brought to life by a talented ensemble led by Geoffrey Rush and Armie Hammer.

That same year, Rush starred as Albert Einstein in the first season of National Geographic's limited anthology series Genius. The series was executive produced by Ron Howard and also starred Emily Watson. Rush won widespread acclaim earning a Primetime Emmy Award nomination as well as Golden Globe Award and Screen Actors Guild Award nominations.

In 2018, upon winning the Screen Actors Guild Award as Winston Churchill for Darkest Hour, Gary Oldman praised Rush as a "giant of acting" along with Robert De Niro, Morgan Freeman, Richard Jenkins, and Denzel Washington.

In 2018, Rush played the character of adult Michael Kingley in Storm Boy alongside Finn Little, Jai Courtney, Trevor Jamieson, Morgan Davies, and Erik Thomson. It was released on 17 January 2019. His acting career stalled for two years after that, following allegations of sexual misconduct. In 2022, he was announced to be starring as Groucho Marx in an adaptation of the memoir Raised Eyebrows, marking his first role since the scandal.

Filmography

Film

Television

Theatre

Awards and honours

Rush has won what is known as the Triple Crown of Acting, meaning an Academy Award, Tony Award and Emmy Award, which represent film, theatre and television respectively. Over his career he has also received three British Academy Film Awards, two Golden Globe Awards, and four Screen Actors Guild Awards. Rush received his Oscar for his performance in Shine in 1996. He has received three other nominations for his roles in Shakespeare in Love (1998), Quills (2000), and The King's Speech (2010). For his work in television he received the Primetime Emmy Award for Outstanding Actor in a Limited Series or Television Movie for his performance as Peter Sellers in The Life and Death of Peter Sellers (2003). Rush received his Tony Award for Best Actor in a Play for his performance in the French absurdist comedy Exit the King (2009).

Rush is the founding president of the Australian Academy of Cinema and Television Arts and was named the 2012 Australian of the Year. In 2014 he was appointed a Companion of the Order of Australia (AC) Australia's highest civilian honour, for eminent service to the arts as a theatre performer, motion picture actor and film producer, as a role model and mentor for aspiring artists, and through support for, and promotion of, the Australian arts industry.

Rush has received various honours over his career including the Sidney Myer Performing Arts Awards in 1994. He was awarded an Honorary Doctorate of Letters by the University of Queensland, in Australia in 1998. In 2001 he was awarded the Australian Centenary Medal in the Queen's New Year's Honours List for his services to the arts. In 2003 he received the Hollywood Film Festival for Supporting Actor of the Year. In 2003 he received the Australian Film Institute Award for Global Achievement Award. 
The following year he received Brisbane International Film Festival's Chauvel Award. In 2009 he received Australian Film Institute Longford Life Achievement Award and was announced as one of the Q150 Icons of Queensland for his role as an "Influential Artist". In 2011 he was honored with Santa Barbara International Film Festival's Montecito Award.

In 2022, he received the Award for Outstanding Artistic Contribution to World Cinema at the Karlovy Vary International Film Festival

Personal life
Since 1988, Rush has been married to actress Jane Menelaus, with whom he has a daughter and a son. Rush lives in Melbourne, and spent several years in Castlemaine, Victoria.

Defamation case 
On 30 November 2017, the Sydney tabloid newspaper The Daily Telegraph published a front-page article alleging that Rush engaged in "inappropriate behaviour" onstage with a co-star during the Sydney Theatre Company's 2015 production of King Lear. The story contained no corroboration for the allegations, though the STC divulged to the Telegraph that they had received a complaint about alleged sexual harassment by Rush. Eryn Jean Norvill, who had starred as Cordelia alongside Rush, alleged that the actor had touched her inappropriately without her consent. 

The Telegraphs story was picked up by various newspapers in Australia but not by the Melbourne Herald Sun because of concerns that the Telegraph was "running with a yarn which is highly libellous". Rush denied the allegations and, on 8 December 2017, announced that he had filed a defamation suit with the Federal Court of Australia, charging that the Telegraph "made false, pejorative and demeaning claims, splattering them with unrelenting bombast on its front pages". In an affidavit, Rush stated that as a result of the allegations, he had been suffering from anxiety, insomnia and loss of appetite, and felt that "his worth to the theatre and film industry is now irreparably damaged".

The trial was concluded on 9 November 2018. On 11 April 2019, the judge ruled in favour of Rush, awarding him $850,000. In his written statement defending his ruling, Justice Michael Wigney said that none of Norvill's claims were proven, due to her evidence being "not credible or reliable and contradicted by other members of the cast", and that Rush's evidence was overwhelming. He also criticised the Telegraph for "recklessly irresponsible pieces of sensationalist journalism of the very worst kind". A month later, the Telegraph was ordered to pay Rush an extended judgement of $2.87 million. The Telegraph motioned to appeal but the judgement was upheld.

Further allegations
On 16 December 2018, The New York Times published an interview with Australian actress Yael Stone, who accused Rush of sexual misconduct during the production of a theatre adaptation of Diary of a Madman in 2010 and 2011. Among the allegations Stone made in interviews to the Times and ABC were incidents where Rush angled a hand mirror over a shower cubicle to observe her naked, sent her flirty text messages and danced naked in front of her in her dressing room. 

Rush responded in a statement to the Times through his attorneys, saying that Stone's allegations were "incorrect and in some instances have been taken completely out of context. However, clearly Yael has been upset on occasion by the spirited enthusiasm I generally bring to my work. I sincerely and deeply regret if I have caused her any distress. This, most certainly, has never been my intention."

References

External links

 
 
 Geoffrey Rush – Stage acting credits
 Professional photographs of Geoffrey Rush – National Library of Australia

1951 births
Living people
20th-century Australian male actors
21st-century Australian male actors
Audiobook narrators
Australian male film actors
Australian male Shakespearean actors
Australian male voice actors
Australian of the Year Award winners
Australian people of English descent
Australian people of German descent
Australian people of Irish descent
Australian people of Scottish descent
Best Actor AACTA Award winners
Best Actor Academy Award winners
Best Actor BAFTA Award winners
Best Drama Actor Golden Globe (film) winners
Best Supporting Actor BAFTA Award winners
Best Miniseries or Television Movie Actor Golden Globe winners
Companions of the Order of Australia
Drama Desk Award winners
Helpmann Award winners
L'École Internationale de Théâtre Jacques Lecoq alumni
Male actors from Brisbane
Male actors from Melbourne
Outstanding Performance by a Cast in a Motion Picture Screen Actors Guild Award winners
Outstanding Performance by a Lead Actor in a Miniseries or Movie Primetime Emmy Award winners
Outstanding Performance by a Male Actor in a Leading Role Screen Actors Guild Award winners
Outstanding Performance by a Male Actor in a Miniseries or Television Movie Screen Actors Guild Award winners
People from Toowoomba
Presidents of the Australian Academy of Cinema and Television Arts
Queensland Greats
Recipients of the Centenary Medal
Theatre World Award winners
Tony Award winners
University of Queensland alumni